Francis McGowan may refer to:

Francis X. McGowan, member of the New York State Assembly 1943 to 1952, in 164th New York State Legislature
Francis McGowan, character in Walking to the Waterline

See also
Frank McGowan (disambiguation)